Cairo Higher Institute of Cinema (Arabic:المعهد العالي للسينما) was founded in 1957 as the first of its kind in the Middle East and Africa, and is affiliated to the ministry of culture. The institute is a member of the International Organisation For Cinema Colleges and Institutes. Over years the institute participated in many international festivals and gained many awards and honour certificates. Beside the bachelor's degree, the institute grants master's and PhD degrees in the art and science of cinema.

Ahmed Kamel Morsi was head of direction at the Institute. Helmi Halim taught scriptwriting there from 1959 until his death in 1971. Graduates of the Institute have included Hicham Abou al-Nasr, Mohamed Abou Seif, Kamla Abou Zikri, Inas al-Deghidi, Radwane al-Kachef, Mohamed Kamal al-Kalioubi, Marwan Hamed, Said Hamed, Mohamed Mostafa Kamal and Sandra Nashaat.

References

External links
 https://web.archive.org/web/20130509164128/http://www.lightsfilmschool.com/cairo/index.html

Education in Cairo
Film schools in Egypt